The Guotai Liquor Asian Players Tour Championship 2012/2013 – Event 2 was a professional minor-ranking snooker tournament that took place between 23 and 27 September 2012 at the Yixing Sports Centre in Yixing, China.

Stephen Lee won his ninth professional title by defeating Ding Junhui 4–0 in the final. This win also guaranteed Lee a place in this season's Players Tour Championship Grand Finals, but he couldn't participate due to his suspension from professional snooker.

Prize fund and ranking points
The breakdown of prize money and ranking points of the event is shown below:

1 Only professional players can earn ranking points.

Main draw

Top half

Section 1

Section 2

Section 3

Section 4

Bottom half

Section 5

Section 6

Section 7

Section 8

Finals

Century breaks
 
 137  Matthew Stevens
 113  Stephen Lee
 111  Ricky Walden
 110, 102  Xiao Guodong
 107, 105, 102  Ding Junhui
 104  Hossein Vafaei

References

Asian 2
2012 in Chinese sport
Snooker competitions in China